is an Apollo near-Earth asteroid that was discovered by the Catalina Sky Survey in Arizona on 11 October 2007. The asteroid passed 554,209 kilometer (344,370 mile or 1.4-lunar distance) from Earth on 29 January 2008 at 08:33 UTC. (At the time of the passage it was believed the closest for any known potentially hazardous asteroid (PHA) of this size before 2027, but in 2010  was measured to be 400 meters in diameter.) At closest approach the asteroid had an apparent magnitude of 10.3 and was about 50 times fainter than the naked eye can see. It required about a  telescope to be seen.

Impact risk assessment
From the date of discovery of asteroid  on 11 October 2007, a total of 316 observations of it had been made by 31 January 2008, spanning 112 days.  Now the asteroid has an observation arc of about 3 years and the trajectory is well defined.  It was removed from the Sentry Risk Table on 4 December 2007 at 14:05 UTC.

2008 passage

Goldstone Observatory carried out radar observations on January 23 and 24 January 2008. As of then, the orbit of the asteroid was known with such a high precision that scientists were able to calculate close approaches from the year 67 AD to 2141 AD.

Observations from Arecibo Observatory were taken on 1–4 February. It is a contact binary asteroid.

Other close approaches
Asteroid 4179 Toutatis (4.5 km diameter) came within 1.5 million km, 0.0104 AU (within 4 lunar distances) of the Earth on 29 September 2004.
On 7 August 2027,  will pass within 388,960 km (0.0026 AU) of Earth
On 13 April 2029, Apophis will pass the earth within the orbits of the geosynchronous communication satellites.

See also
List of exceptional asteroids
Asteroid impact avoidance
Asteroid naming conventions
Radar astronomy

References

External links 
 Asteroid to Make Rare Close Flyby of Earth (Catalina Sky Survey Photo)
 Huge asteroid to fly by past earth.Independent Online
 Asteroid 2007 TU24: No Danger to Earth (Phil Plait 25 January 2008)
 
 
 

Minor planet object articles (unnumbered)
Discoveries by the Catalina Sky Survey

20071011